Richard Ríos Montoya (born 2 June 2000) is a Colombian footballer who plays as a central midfielder for Campeonato Brasileiro Série B club Guarani.

Club career

Early career
Born in Vegachí, Ríos started his career playing futsal, and attracted the interest of Flamengo during the 2018 South American Under-20 Futsal Championship. He was invited for a trial period at the Brazilian club and, after two months, Flamengo signed him to their youth team.

Flamengo
In the beginning of the 2020 season, despite still playing in the youth team, Ríos was promoted to the professional team to play alongside reserve players and other youngsters in the first matches of the 2020 Campeonato Carioca. He made his senior debut on 23 January 2020, coming on as a second-half susbtitute for Matheus Dantas in a 1–0 away win over Vasco da Gama.

Ríos made his Série A debut on 27 September 2020, replacing Guilherme Bala in a 1–1 away draw against Palmeiras, as Flamengo was heavily impacted due to a COVID-19 outbreak in the squad. The following day, his contract was renewed until December 2021.

On 21 June 2021, Ríos signed a contract extension with Flamengo until December 2023, on the same day the club announced his loan to Mexican club Mazatlán.

Mazatlán (loan)
On 23 June 2021, Flamengo confirmed the one-year loan deal of Ríos to Mazatlán. He made his debut for the club on 26 July, replacing Alfonso Sánchez in a 2–0 away win against Cruz Azul.

In September 2021, Ríos suffered a knee injury, only returning to action the following April. In May, after only six matches, Mazatlán opted to not exercise his US$ 1 million buyout clause, and he returned to Flamengo.

Guarani
On 4 August 2022, Ríos terminated his contract with Flamengo, and signed a deal with Série B side Guarani until December 2023. He scored his first professional goal on 11 October, netting the winner in a 1–0 home success over CRB.

In the 2023 season, Ríos became a key unit at Bugre.

Career statistics

Honours

Club
Flamengo
Campeonato Brasileiro Série A: 2020
Campeonato Carioca: 2020, 2021

References

External links
 

2000 births
Living people
Colombian footballers
Sportspeople from Antioquia Department
Association football midfielders
Campeonato Brasileiro Série A players
Campeonato Brasileiro Série B players
CR Flamengo footballers
Guarani FC players
Liga MX players
Mazatlán F.C. footballers
Expatriate footballers in Brazil
Expatriate footballers in Mexico
Colombian expatriate sportspeople in Brazil
Colombian expatriate sportspeople in Mexico